Our Lady Queen of the World Catholic Academy, previously known as Jean Vanier Catholic High School, is a high school in Richmond Hill, Ontario, Canada administered by the York Catholic District School Board (YCDSB). It is a fragrance-free school. Opened in 2009, it currently serves the city of Richmond Hill.

Name
The school was previously known as Jean Vanier Catholic High School, but a proposal to rename it was presented to the YCDSB trustees in February 2020 and the resolution to do so passed at a board meeting on 20 May 2020. This was done as a result of allegations that the school's namesake Jean Vanier had engaged in "manipulative and emotionally abusive" sexual relationships with six women "in the context of spiritual accompaniment" between 1970 and 2005. The chosen name "Our Lady Queen of the World Catholic Academy" refers to Mary, mother of Jesus and is also the name of the church beside the school.

References

See also
List of high schools in Ontario

Education in Richmond Hill, Ontario
High schools in the Regional Municipality of York
York Catholic District School Board
Educational institutions established in 2009
Catholic secondary schools in Ontario
2009 establishments in Ontario
Naming controversies